SS William D. Bloxham was a Liberty ship built in the United States during World War II. She was named after William D. Bloxham, the Secretary of State of Florida (1877–1880) and the 13th and 17th Governor of Florida (1881–1885 and 1897–1901).

Construction
William D. Bloxham was laid down on 5 May 1944, under a Maritime Commission (MARCOM) contract, MC hull 2306, by J.A. Jones Construction, Panama City, Florida; she was sponsored by Miss Joan Blair, and launched on 13 June 1944.

History
She was allocated to William J. Rountree & Company, on 28 June 1944. On 11 June 1946, she was laid up in the National Defense Reserve Fleet, in the James River Group. On 18 January 1947, she was transferred to the Italian Government, which in turn sold her for $549,813.52 to Lloyd Triestino, Trieste, Italy, for commercial use. She was renamed Sistiana. After being sold to a couple more owners she was scrapped in 1972.

References

Bibliography

 
 
 
 
 

 

Liberty ships
Ships built in Panama City, Florida
1944 ships
Liberty ships transferred to Italy